The Thunder Board was an 8-bit mono personal computer integrated circuit sound card from Media Vision, that had Sound Blaster compatibility at a reduced price. It was widely advertised as “proudly made in the USA”; possibly a reference to the Sound Blaster, manufactured by the competing Singapore-based Creative Technologies. Emulates SB 1.0 and 1.5

Other features included:

 8 Bit mono record and playback of .VOC files
 Yamaha YM3812 OPL2 FM Synth
 2 Watt output 
 Joystick Port
 8 Bit ISA bus
 Volume Control
 Powered Output Jack
 Microphone Input Jack

Sound cards